Rammenau (German) or Ramnow (Upper Sorbian) is a municipality in the district of Bautzen, in Saxony, Germany.
It is known as the birthplace of the well-known German philosopher Johann Gottlieb Fichte (1762–1814).

Rammenau Castle was built between 1721 and 1735 by architect Johann Christoph Knöffel for Ernst Ferdinand von Knoch, chamberlain of king Augustus II the Strong. As Knoch went bankrupt with the immense costs of this project, Franz Josef von Hoffmann purchased it in a foreclosure auction in 1744. In 1879 it was sold to the von Posern family, with the last owner, Margarete von Helldorff née von Posern, being expropriated by the communists in 1945. Today it is owned by the State Palaces, Castles and Gardens of Saxony and open to the public, housing a museum with period furniture.

See also 
 List of Baroque residences

References

Literature

External links 
 

Municipalities in Saxony
Populated places in Bautzen (district)